El Tunari is a weekly newspaper published in Quillacollo, Bolivia. The newspaper began publication on 26 February 2011.

References

2011 establishments in Bolivia
Newspapers published in Bolivia
Publications established in 2011
Weekly newspapers
Spanish-language newspapers